Dominick Drexler (born 26 May 1990) is a German footballer who plays as an attacking midfielder for Bundesliga club Schalke 04.

Career
Drexler played as a teenager for Bonner SC, Alemannia Aachen, and Bayer Leverkusen before joining Rot-Weiß Erfurt in 2010. He made his debut for the club in September of that year, as a substitute for Tino Semmer in a Thuringia derby against Carl Zeiss Jena which Erfurt won 2–1. He finished the 2010–11 season with four goals in 19 appearances. He scored eight goals in 34 appearances in the 2011–12 season and four goals in 28 appearances in the 2012–13 season.

In July 2013, he signed for Greuther Fürth, where he spent the 2012–13 season, scoring a goal in 11 competitive matches. He also scored four goals in five matches for the reserve team. Then he joined VfR Aalen for the 2014–15 season. He scored one goal in 26 competitive appearances. In the following season, he scored nine goals in 32 competitive appearances. He then joined Holstein Kiel for the 2016-17 season. During that season, he scored seven goals in 35 appearances. During the 2017–18 season, he scored 14 goals in 34 appearances. This includes two goals in two appearances in the DFB Pokal and an appearance in the Promotion playoff.

Drexler signed with Midtjylland for the 2018–19 season. The transfer fee paid to Holstein Kiel was reported to be €2.5 million. However, during the same summer he was transferred again to 2. Bundesliga side 1. FC Köln for a reported fee of €4.5 million.

On 21 July 2021, he agreed to join Schalke 04, newly relegated from the Bundesliga, signing a two-year contract.

Career statistics

Honours
1. FC Köln
2. Bundesliga: 2018–19

Schalke 04
2. Bundesliga: 2021–22

References

External links

 Profile at the FC Schalke 04 website
 
 

1990 births
Living people
Sportspeople from Bonn
Association football midfielders
German footballers
Bayer 04 Leverkusen II players
FC Rot-Weiß Erfurt players
SpVgg Greuther Fürth players
VfR Aalen players
Holstein Kiel players
FC Midtjylland players
1. FC Köln players
FC Schalke 04 players
Bundesliga players
2. Bundesliga players
3. Liga players
Regionalliga players
Footballers from North Rhine-Westphalia
German expatriate footballers
Expatriate men's footballers in Denmark
German expatriate sportspeople in Denmark